Gennady Viktorovich Komnatov (18 September 1949 – 1 April 1979) was a Russian road cyclist. He was part of the Soviet team that won a gold medal in the 100 km team time trial at the 1972 Summer Olympics. He won three silver medals at the world championships in 1973–1975 in this event.

Komnatov was the eldest sibling in a family of four brothers and one sister. Influenced by Gennady, two of his younger brothers, Vasily and Stanislav, became cycling coaches. Komnatov died aged 29 in a traffic accident. A monument in his honor stands in the village of Zhelannoye where he was born.

References

1949 births
1979 deaths
Olympic cyclists of the Soviet Union
Olympic gold medalists for the Soviet Union
Cyclists at the 1972 Summer Olympics
Olympic medalists in cycling
Soviet male cyclists
Russian male cyclists
Road incident deaths in the Soviet Union
People from Omsk Oblast
Medalists at the 1972 Summer Olympics
Road incident deaths in Russia